Akshaya College of Engineering and Technology (Tamil:அக்ஷயா பொறியியல் மற்றும் தொழில் நுட்பக்கல்லூரி) is a private self-financing engineering college in Kinathukadavu, Coimbatore, Tamil Nadu, India. The college is approved by AICTE and affiliated to Anna University.

History
Akshaya College of Engineering and Technology (ACET) was established by Akshaya Charitable Trust in the year 2009.

Programmes offered
Undergraduate courses
 B.E. – Civil Engineering
 B.E. – Electronics and Communication Engineering
 B.E. – Mechanical Engineering
 B.E. – Electrical and Electronics Engineering
 B.E. – Computer Science and Engineering
 B.E – Mechatronics
 B.Tech. – Artificial Intelligence Data Science (AIDS)
 B.Tech. – Computer Science and Business System (CSBS)
Postgraduate courses
 M.E. – Computer Science and Engineering
 M.E. – VLSI Design
 M.E. – Structural Engineering

Library 

Library Collections:

Facilities

Hostels

Boys hostel 
The boys hostel has 96 rooms spread over three floors and accommodates about 350 students.

Girls hostel

Transport
Buses are available to all parts of Coimbatore, Pollachi, Udumalpet, Nemmara, Kaliyapuram, Dhasarpatti, Mettupalayam, Alandurai, Dhali, Kerala, Vadavalli, Vellalore, Sundakamuthur, Vaalavadi, Gandhipuram, Avinashi, Parle, Erisinampatti, Devanurpudhur, Elaiyamuthur, Kanuvai, Govindhapuram, Madathukulam, Vaarapatti,   and Pirayari.

Sports 

The college offers the following sports

1. Basketball
2. Cricket
3. Ball Badminton
4. Football
5. Volleyball
6. Throwball
7. Chess
8. Kabbadi

References

External links
 Official website

Engineering colleges in Coimbatore
Educational institutions established in 2009
2009 establishments in Tamil Nadu